Secondary Highway 522, commonly referred to as Highway 522, is a provincially maintained highway in the Canadian province of Ontario. Highway 522 serves as the only link between these two routes south of Highway 17 and north of Highway 124. It is often used to access Grundy Lake Provincial Park, a popular camping area for northbound travellers.

Highway 522 was established between Loring and Trout Creek alongside many other secondary highways in 1956. It was extended to the Pickerel River in 1965, but did not connect with Highway 69 until the mid-1970s. It was fully paved by 1980. In 2002, the Trout Creek Bypass opened, shifting Highway 11 around the town. Highway 522 was extended from its eastern terminus south to an interchange with the new bypass as a result.

Route description 

Highway 522 begins at a junction with Highway 69 in the community of Cranberry. This terminus will be upgraded to an interchange with the future Highway 400 in the near future. It travels east and provides access to Grundy Lake Provincial Park, then enters a mostly remote wilderness of the Canadian Shield, dominated by thick forest and rock outcroppings. The route services cottages along the northern shorelines of Kawigamog Lake, Little Long Lake, Wauquimakog Lake and Seagull Lake while passing through the communities of Pakesley, Lost Channel, Ess Narrows Landing, Fleming's Landing, Loring, Spring Creek, Port Loring and Arnstein.

Highway 522 continues through Golden Valley and Bear Valley, south of the Loring Deer Yard, before meeting Highway 524 at Farley's Corners. There the highway briefly curves southwards to Commanda, where it crosses the Commanda Creek and resumes its eastward journey. It passes through Gurd Township for an additional  before entering Trout Creek. Within that town the route is maintained under a Connecting Link agreement between Barrett Street and the junction with Highway 522B (Main Street) downtown.
At that junction, drivers must turn south to remain on the highway. It continues another  to an interchange with Highway 11.

Like other provincial routes in Ontario, Highway 522 is maintained by the Ministry of Transportation of Ontario. In 2010, traffic surveys conducted by the ministry showed that on average, 880 vehicles used the highway daily along the  section between Highway 11 in Trout Creek and the Commanda Creek bridge while 450 vehicles did so each day along the  section east of Grundy Lake Provincial Park, the highest and lowest counts along the highway, respectively.

History 
Highway 522 was initially designated in 1956, along with many of the secondary highways in Ontario.
However, the route only travelled from Trout Creek as far west as Loring. It was paved into Trout Creek and between Loring and Arnstein, but a gravel road otherwise.
The route was paved between Arnstein and Golden Valley by 1958,
and to east of Commanda in 1961
Under the funding of a "day labour program", the route was extended west  along a gravel road to the Pickerel River at Kawigamog Lake on April 25, 1965.
The remainder of the route between Commanda and Trout Creek was paved in 1966, and work continued to extend Highway 522 further west.
The route was extended as a gravel road to Highway 69 at some point between 1974 and 1976.
The remaining gravel sections, west of Loring, were paved in 1978 or 1979.

Trout Creek Bypass 
In 2002, Highway 11 was re-routed along a recently completed bypass around Trout Creek. Highway 522 was then extended south by  along the former alignment of Highway 11, terminating at the new alignment of Highway 11 at Exit 301 (interchange with Highway 522 and McFadden Lane). The remainder of the former alignment of Highway 11 running north in Trout Creek was retained in the provincial system and renumbered as Highway 522B, terminating at Exit 306 (interchange with Highway 522B and Hemlock Road).

Major intersections

References 

522
Roads in Parry Sound District